The Laura W. Bush Institute for Women's Health within the Texas Tech University Health Sciences Center was established in 2007 to promote research specific to women's health, to provide advanced sex and gender specific education to health care professionals, and to enrich the lives of women and girls through community programs and cancer prevention.

In ten years, more than 60,000 women and girls have been served through inspiring programs, resources, vaccines, and cancer screenings.

Research 
Over a period of 8 years, the Laura W. Bush Institute provided scientists over $2.5 million for groundbreaking research unique to women’s health.  They award grants to faculty and students within Texas Tech University Health Sciences Center schools of Health Professions, Medicine, Nursing, Pharmacy, and Biomedical Sciences; as well as Angelo State University College of Health and Human Services.  Understanding that scientific research on women lags far behind men, they expect this new data to lead to more accurate diagnosis and treatments for women.

Education 
As new information regarding women’s health is published, online curriculum translate science into practice by updating students and practitioners with new data regarding sex and gender differences that are not common knowledge.  At their website www.sexandgenderhealth.org the Laura W. Bush Institute’s slide library, teaching modules, and video library are tailored to health care professors to assi st in teaching sex and gender differences across many diseases.

Community Impact 
The Laura W. Bush Institute for Women’s Health hosts one signature fundraising event in these Texas cities each year:  Abilene, Amarillo, Dallas, Lubbock, Permian Basin, and San Angelo.  By 2018, over   $4 million had fueled important programs that meet the unique needs of each city.  For middle school girls there are messages of personal safety, anti-bullying, good nutrition, friendship and self-care through events called GiRL Power.  For college women, there are messages of self-defense, healthy relationships, self-determination, and mental and physical health at Girls Night Out and Women’s Night at the Rec.  The Institute hosts coffees and luncheons for women that provide updates on cancer, heart disease, stem cells, mental health and many other topics. As of 2018, the community events have touched the lives of over 85,000 Texans across all regions of west Texas. 

Multi-year Cancer Prevention and Research Institute of Texas (CPRIT) grants have provided over $7.5 million and directly affected more than 25,000 women with education and screenings.  By 2018, the Institute facilitated 8,000 mammograms and diagnostic services, which diagnosed 132 cancers and provided approximately 6,500 HPV vaccinations.

The Laura W. Bush Institute for Women’s Health has become an integral part of the cities served, all of which have Texas Tech University Health Sciences Center medical, nursing, pharmacy, or biomedical science schools.  It serves the uninsured and the underinsured in many rural communities that have limited resources. 

The Institute work continues thanks to the generosity of people who share their mission to improve the lives and health of women, girls and families.  The Texas Tech University Health Sciences Center supports approximately eighty percent of expenses to allow the majority of funds raised to be directed to the mission.

"I joined this effort because of my advocacy for the good health of women worldwide and my lifelong affection for my home, west Texas." Mrs. Laura Bush

Leadership 
Executive Director                Connie Tyne

Chief Scientific Officer          Marjorie Jenkins, MD

Co-Director of Curriculum    Cynthia Jumper, MD

Co-Director of Curriculum    Simon Williams, PhD

References

External links 
 Laura W. Bush Institute for Women's Health
 Texas Tech University Health Sciences Center

Texas Tech University Health Sciences Center
2007 establishments in Texas
Laura Bush